Euryope sanguinea is a species of leaf beetle of the Democratic Republic of the Congo, described by Guillaume-Antoine Olivier in 1808.

References 

Eumolpinae
Beetles of the Democratic Republic of the Congo
Taxa named by Guillaume-Antoine Olivier
Beetles described in 1808
Endemic fauna of the Democratic Republic of the Congo